Arthur James Breakwell (1881–1930) was an English footballer who played in the Football League for Wolverhampton Wanderers.

References

1881 births
1930 deaths
English footballers
Association football forwards
English Football League players
Wolverhampton Wanderers F.C. players
Brierley Hill Alliance F.C. players
Bilston Town F.C. players